The 1992 National Camogie League is a competition in the women's team field sport of camogie was won by Cork, who defeated Wexford in the final, played at Enniscorthy.

Arrangements
Wexford beat Dublin by 2-14 to 3-3 in the semi-final at O'Toole Park.

The Final
Cork outclassed Wexford in the final on front of a large crowd at Belfield, Eniscorthy. Two goals just before half time from Fiona O'Driscoll and Collette O'Mahony killed off any chance Wexford had, and left Cork 2-10 to 0-6 at half time. The Irish Press reported:  Wexford squandered too many scoring opportunities during the game, their forwards having a completely off day.

Division 2
The Junior National League, known since 2006 as Division Two, was won by Limerick who defeated Down in the final.

Final stages

References

External links
 Camogie Association

National Camogie League
1992